3551 Verenia, provisional designation , is an Amor asteroid and a Mars crosser discovered on 12 September 1983 by R. Scott Dunbar. Although Verenia passed within 40 Gm of the Earth in the 20th century, it will never do so in the 21st. In 2028 it will come within 0.025 AU of Ceres.

3551 Verenia was named for the first vestal virgin consecrated by the legendary Roman king Numa Pompilius.

See also
 V-type asteroid
 HED meteorite
 4 Vesta
 4055 Magellan
 3908 Nyx

References

External links 
 Catchall Catalog of Minor Planets
 NeoDys 
 
 
 

003551
Discoveries by R. Scott Dunbar
Named minor planets
003551
19830912